The Boyne River is a river in Simcoe County and Dufferin County in Central Ontario, Canada. It is part of the Great Lakes Basin, and is a left tributary of the Nottawasaga River. The rivers falls within the jurisdiction of the Nottawasaga Valley Conservation Authority.

Course
The river begins at an unnamed pond in Melancthon, Dufferin County, that lies between the Toronto, Grey and Bruce Railway line and Ontario Highway 10. It heads southeast past the town of Shelburne, then heads east northeast roughly parallel to Ontario Highway 89 for the remainder of its course. It enters Mulmur, passes through Boyne Valley Provincial Park, and enters Adjala–Tosorontio in Simcoe County. The river goes through Earl Rowe Provincial Park (mostly as Earl Rowe Lake), briefly flows through New Tecumseth at the community of Alliston, then reaches its mouth at the Nottawasaga River at Essa. The Nottawasaga River flows to Georgian Bay on Lake Huron.

Tributaries
Spring Creek (right)
Rosemont Creek (right)
Tosorontio Creek (right)
Primrose Creek (right)

References

Sources

Rivers of Dufferin County
Rivers of Simcoe County